Pediasia naumanni is a moth in the family Crambidae. It was described by Stanisław Błeszyński in 1969. It is found in Madagascar.

References

Crambini
Moths described in 1969
Moths of Madagascar